XHKQ-FM is a radio station on 93.1 FM in Tapachula, Chiapas. It is known as Fiesta Mexicana with a grupera format.

History
XEKQ-AM received its concession on April 20, 1958. It operated on 680 kHz and was owned by Radio Soconusco, S.A. It moved to FM in 2010.

References

Radio stations in Chiapas